The Cape to Cairo Railway was an unfinished project to create a railway line crossing Africa from south to north. It would have been the largest and most important railway of that continent. It was planned as a link between Cape Town in South Africa and Port Said in Egypt.

The project was never completed. Important parts which were completed have been inoperative for many years, due to wars and lack of maintenance by the former colonies.

This plan was initiated at the end of the 19th century, during the time of Western  colonial rule, largely based on the vision of Cecil Rhodes, in an attempt to connect adjacent African possessions of the British Empire through a continuous railway line from Cape Town, South Africa to Cairo, Egypt.

Construction
The original proposal for a Cape to Cairo railway was made in 1874 by Edwin Arnold, then the editor of The Daily Telegraph, which was joint sponsor of the expedition by H.M. Stanley to Africa to discover the course of the Congo River. The proposed route involved a mixture of railway and river transport between Elizabethville in the Belgian Congo (now Lubumbashi in the Democratic Republic of the Congo) and Sennar in the Sudan rather than a completely rail one.

Imperialist and entrepreneur Cecil Rhodes was instrumental in securing the southern states of the continent for the British Empire and envisioned a continuous "red line" of British dominions from north to south. A railway would be a critical element in this scheme to unify the possessions, facilitate governance, enable the military to move quickly to hot spots or conduct war, help settlement and enable intra- and extra-continental goods trade. The construction of this project presented a major technological challenge.

France had a somewhat rival strategy in the late 1890s to link its western and eastern African colonies, namely  Senegal to Djibouti. Southern Sudan and Ethiopia were in the way, but France sent expeditions in 1897 to establish a protectorate in southern Sudan and to find a route across Ethiopia. The scheme foundered when a British flotilla on the River Nile confronted the French expedition at the point of intersection between the French and British routes, leading to the Fashoda Incident and eventual French retreat.

The Portuguese considered an Angola to Mozambique railway to link west with east and produced the "Pink Map" representing their claims to sovereignty in Africa (to link Angola and Mozambique).

Opposition to British rule in South Africa was settled after the First and Second Boer Wars (ended in 1902 but only incorporating its two states into the new Union of South Africa in 1910).

Egypt has a rail system that, as early as 1854, connected Port Said, Alexandria and Cairo, and now currently goes as far south as Aswan. After a ferry link up on the Nile, the railway continues in Sudan from Wadi Halfa to Khartoum at the  meter gauge; see Northern Africa Railroad Development. This part of the system was started by Lord Kitchener in 1897 to provide supplies during his war against the Mahdist uprising. Further railway links go south, the most southern point being Wau.

South Sudan became independent in 2011. The border between Sudan and South Sudan is closed, and the railways in South Sudan are no longer operational.

Most of Sudan's railway network is in disrepair due to political turmoil and US sanctions. A Khartoum–Atbara railway service began running in 2014 after China provided equipment and supplies. Other railway services have been put into place in Khartoum and surrounding areas.

Missed completion 
British interests had to overcome obstacles of geography and climate, and the competing imperial schemes of the French, Portuguese and Germans.  In 1891, Germany secured the strategically critical territory of German East Africa, which along with the mountainous rainforest of the Belgian Congo precluded the building of a Cape to Cairo railway.

In 1916 during World War I British, African and Indian soldiers won the Tanganyika Territory from the Germans, and after the war the British continued to rule the territory, which was a League of Nations mandate from 1922. The continuous line of colonies was complete. 

Construction started from Cape Town and went parallel to the Great North Road to Kimberley through a part of Botswana to Bulawayo. From this junction the link proceeded further north. The Victoria Falls Bridge with completed in 1905.

The British Empire possessed the political power to complete the Cape to Cairo Railway, but economics, including the Great Depression of the 1930s, prevented its completion before World War II.  After World War II, the decolonisation of Africa and the establishment of independent countries removed the colonial rationale for the project and increased the project's difficulty, effectively ending the project.

Operating segments 
Currently operational length is  out of total .  The operational status of sections of the railway is as follows:
 South-western section: starting from Cape Town, passing through Kimberley and Mahikeng in South Africa, Gaborone and Francistown in Botswana, to Bulawayo in Zimbabwe.
 South-eastern section: from Port Elizabeth, passing through Bloemfontein, Johannesburg, Pretoria and Musina in South Africa, to Bulawayo in Zimbabwe.
 South-central section: Bulawayo league to Victoria Falls in Zimbabwe, to Livingstone, Lusaka and Ndola in Zambia, to Sakania, Lubumbashi, Tenke, Bukama, Kamina, Kabalo and Kindu in the Congo-Kinshasa.
 Incomplete stretch from Kindu to Uvira in Congo-Kinshasa, Bujumbura and Kayanza in Burundi, Butare and Kigali in Rwanda, to Kampala in Uganda.
 Central stretch: connects Kampala to Njeru, Busembatia, Tororo and Gulu in Uganda.
 Incomplete stretch from Gulu in Uganda to Juba and Wau in South Sudan.
 Dead end of Wau in South Sudan to Babanusa in Sudan, due to local wars (see: Babanusa-Wau Railway).
 North-upper Nile stretch: connects Babanusa to Sennar, Khartoum and Wadi Halfa in Sudan.
 Incomplete stretch of Wadi Halfa in Sudan to Aswan in Egypt.
 North-lower Nile stretch: connects Aswan to Luxor, Asyut, Cairo and Benha in Egypt.
 North-western section: connects Benha to Alexandria in Egypt.
 North-central stretch: connects Benha to Damietta in Egypt.
 North-eastern section: connects Benha to Port Said in Egypt.

Connection with other railway systems

Uganda railway

East Africa has a network of narrow gauge  railways that historically grew from ports on the Indian Ocean and went westward, built in parallel under British and German colonial rule. The furthest string north was the Uganda Railway. Eventually these networks were linked, so that today there is a continuous rail connection between Kampala, Uganda, on Lake Victoria to the coastal cities of Mombasa in Kenya and Dar es Salaam in Tanzania.  Up to the break-up of the East African Community in 1977, these companies operated as East African Railways, but operate today as different national companies.

TAZARA link

From Dar es Salaam, a 1,860 km rail link to Kapiri Mposhi in Zambia was built from 1970 to 1975 as a turnkey project financed and supported by China. This Tanzania-Zambia-Railway (TAZARA) was built to connect landlocked Zambia and its mineral wealth to a port on the Indian Ocean, independent from port connections in South Africa, a frequent rival economic competitor in the mining sectors or Mozambique, at that time Portuguese-controlled territory. Not intended in the grand picture of the Cape to Cairo Railway, the TAZARA fills a critical link. This connection uses the  gauge of the southern part of Africa.

Benguela-Katanga link 

In the city of Tenke, in the Democratic Republic of Congo, there is an interconnection of the Cape-Cairo Railway with the Katanga-Benguela railway linking it to the port of Lobito in Angola, on the Atlantic coast.

Kidatu connection
In 1998, a transshipment hub was built at Kidatu in southern Tanzania to connect the metre gauge Central Line (Tanzania) with the Cape gauge TAZARA line. This also shortened the distance.

Railway systems in Mozambique, Zimbabwe and South Africa

The railway is connected to the Mozambican, Zimbabwean and South African systems through the Beira-Bulawayo railway, the Limpopo railway and the Pretoria-Maputo railway, reaching the ports of Maputo and Beira.

Road 
The Court Treatt expedition, an attempt to travel from Cape to Cairo by road, was made in 1924 using two cars.

The Cape to Cairo Road was planned to roughly connect the same countries.  That plan was updated with the Cairo–Cape Town Highway plan, large sections of which are paved and passable.

In fiction 

John Crowley's  science fiction novella Great Work of Time features an alternative history in which the British Empire survived to the end of the 20th century and beyond, and the Cape to Cairo Railway was completed. In an early chapter the protagonist travels in comfort the whole route from South Africa to Egypt.

See also 

 Cape to Cairo
 Cape to Cairo Red Line
 Cairo – Cape Town Highway
 Northern Africa Railroad Development
 Scramble for Africa
 Fashoda Incident
 East African Railway Master Plan
 Lamu Port and Lamu-Southern Sudan-Ethiopia Transport Corridor – 2012
 Kunming–Singapore railway

References

Sources
 
 
 Tabor, George, The Cape to Cairo Railway & River Routes (2003), London: Genta. .

External links 
 The trip from Cairo to Kenya in 1935
 Rovos Rail luxury tours from Cape Town to Cairo
 Lamu Nadapal map – 2012
 Its status as of 1922: Link.
 An interesting news story from 1924: Link

Rail transport in Africa
British colonisation in Africa
International railway lines
History of Africa
Unfinished buildings and structures
Cecil Rhodes